Dankovsky (masculine), Dankovskaya (feminine), or Dankovskoye (neuter) may refer to:
Dankovsky District, a district of Lipetsk Oblast, Russia
Dankovskaya, a rural locality (a village) in Arkhangelsk Oblast, Russia